Craig is an unincorporated community in Washington Township, Decatur County, Indiana.

Geography

References

Unincorporated communities in Decatur County, Indiana
Unincorporated communities in Indiana